The 2017 OVC softball championship was held May 10–14 at Choccolocco Park in Oxford, Alabama. This marked the 24th time the championship had been held and the fifth year it featured eight teams. This year was the second straight year it was held at the neutral site in Oxford instead of on the home field of the No. 1 seed.  The tournament winner, Jacksonville State, earned the OVC's automatic bid to the 2017 NCAA Division I softball tournament. All games were streamed courtesy of the OVC Digital Network.

In 2016, Jacksonville State had won its fifth OVC Championship and first since 2013 by topping SIUE in the Championship Game.

Results

References

tournament
2017 NCAA Division I softball season
Ohio Valley Conference softball tournament